The 1979–80 Washington Capitals season was the Washington Capitals sixth season in the National Hockey League (NHL).

Offseason

Regular season

Final standings

Schedule and results

Playoffs
The Capitals still failed to make the playoffs. Washington was tied with the Edmonton Oilers for the last berth with two games remaining, but lost to the Philadelphia Flyers and tied the Atlanta Flames, while the Oilers tied the Minnesota North Stars and defeated the Colorado Rockies to finish two points ahead.

Player statistics

Regular season
Scoring

Goaltending

Note: GP = Games played; G = Goals; A = Assists; Pts = Points; +/- = Plus/minus; PIM = Penalty minutes; PPG=Power-play goals; SHG=Short-handed goals; GWG=Game-winning goals
      MIN=Minutes played; W = Wins; L = Losses; T = Ties; GA = Goals against; GAA = Goals against average; SO = Shutouts;

Awards and records

Transactions

Draft picks
Washington's draft picks at the 1979 NHL Entry Draft held at the Queen Elizabeth Hotel in Montreal, Quebec.

Farm teams

See also
 1979–80 NHL season

References

External links
 

Washington Capitals seasons
Wash
Wash
1979 in sports in Washington, D.C.
Washing